Leeton is the name of more than one place:

Leeton, Missouri, a town in the United States
Leeton, New South Wales, a town and local government area of New South Wales, Australia